Marotrao Sainuji Kowase (born 3 November 1949) is an Indian politician and a member of the 15th Lok Sabha of India. He represents the Gadchiroli-Chimur constituency of Maharashtra and is a member of the Indian National Congress (INC) political party.

He was member of Legislative Assembly of Maharashtra State during 1980–85, 1990–95 and 1995–1999. He was the Minister of State for Tribal Welfare in the Maharashtra State Government led by Sharad Pawar.

He has been elected from the Gadchiroli-Chimur Lok Sabha Constituency as a member of the 15th Lok Sabha, the results of which were declared on 16 May 2009.

Kowase belongs to a tribal family and hails from Bhadbhidi, which is a small village in Chamorshi Tehsil of Gadchiroli District. He has done his Master of Arts in political science.

References

External links
 Biographical sketch in the Parliament of India website

Living people
1949 births
Indian National Congress politicians
People from Maharashtra
People from Gadchiroli district
India MPs 2009–2014
Marathi politicians
Lok Sabha members from Maharashtra
Maharashtra MLAs 1980–1985
Maharashtra MLAs 1990–1995
Maharashtra MLAs 1995–1999
Indian National Congress politicians from Maharashtra